The 2011–12 CEV Challenge Cup was the 32nd edition of the European Challenge Cup volleyball club tournament, the former CEV Cup.

The final of 2011–12 CEV Challenge Cup became Polish derby, because of Tytan AZS Częstochowa and AZS Politechnika Warszawska meetings. Tytan AZS Częstochowa won the first match and lost the next one after tie-break, but their victory was decided by the golden set. The Most Valuable Player of final matches was chosen captain of winner team, Polish player Dawid Murek.

Participating teams

Qualification phase

1st round
1st leg 22–23 October 2011
2nd leg 29–30 October 2011

|}

2nd round
1st leg 13–15 December 2011
2nd leg 20–22 December 2011

|}

Main phase

16th finals
1st leg 10–12 January 2012
2nd leg 17–19 January 2012

|}

8th finals
1st leg 31 January – 2 February 2012
2nd leg 7–9 February 2012

|}

4th finals
1st leg 21–23 February 2012
2nd leg 28 February – 1 March 2012

|}

Final phase

Semi finals

|}

First leg

|}

Second leg

|}

Final

First leg

|}

Second leg

|}

Final standing

References

External links
 Official site

CEV Challenge Cup
2011 in volleyball
2012 in volleyball